Keith Beauregard (born May 15, 1983) is an American professional baseball coach. He is a hitting coach for the Detroit Tigers of Major League Baseball (MLB).

Career
Beauregard graduated from Leominster High School in Leominster, Massachusetts, in 2001. He enrolled at Saint Anselm College, where he played college baseball for the Saint Anselm Hawks. He was named All-Northeast-10 Conference in all four years at Saint Anselm. After graduating, Beauregard played baseball in a semi-professional league before playing professional baseball for three years with the Worcester Tornadoes in the Canadian American Association of Professional Baseball, an independent baseball league, from 2005 to 2007. After he retired, he worked in real estate.

Beauregard was an assistant coach at the University of Massachusetts, Lowell for two years. While there, he also served as the bench coach for the Pittsfield Colonials of the Cam-Am League in 2011. He was an assistant coach at Santa Clara University for five years. He became a minor league hitting instructor for the Los Angeles Dodgers before becoming their assistant minor league field coordinator. After the 2022 season, the Detroit Tigers hired Beauregard as a major league hitting coach.

Personal life
Beauregard and his wife, Monica, have two daughters. They live in Buckeye, Arizona.

References

External links

Living people
1983 births
Detroit Tigers coaches
Major League Baseball hitting coaches
People from Leominster, Massachusetts
Pittsfield Colonials players
Saint Anselm Hawks baseball players
Santa Clara Broncos baseball coaches
UMass Lowell River Hawks baseball coaches
Worcester Tornadoes players